Arapatiella psilophylla is a species of legume in the family Fabaceae.

The plant is endemic to the Atlantic Forest ecoregion in southeastern Brazil.

See also
 List of plants of Atlantic Forest vegetation of Brazil
 Pau Brasil National Park — plant is native to park.

References

Caesalpinioideae
Endemic flora of Brazil
Flora of the Atlantic Forest
Vulnerable flora of South America
Taxonomy articles created by Polbot